The Jawaharlal Nehru Technological University-Gurajada, Vizianagaram (JNTU-GV) is a public university located in Vizianagaram, Andhra Pradesh. It was established on 12 January 2022. The university was named after Gurajada Apparao,  a noted Indian playwright, dramatist, poet, and writer known for his works in Telugu theatre. The university mainly focuses on engineering.

History

The University College of Engineering Vizianagaram was established as a constituent college of Jawaharlal Nehru Technological University, Hyderabad in 2007. After the trifurcation of JNTU Hyderabad into three universities, the college has become the constituent college of Jawaharlal Nehru Technological University, Kakinada in 2008. On November 24, 2021 Government of Andhra Pradesh introduced a bill in the Andhra Pradesh Legislative Assembly to upgrade the college into an autonomous university. On 12 January 2022, the university was officially established, through the Jawaharlal Nehru Technological Universities (Amendment) Act, 2021.

Campus

The territorial jurisdiction of the university comprises three erstwhile north coastal districts of Andhra Pradesh: Visakhapatnam, Vizianagaram and Srikakulam.

Academics

The University consists of 7 engineering departments, offering 7 undergraduate engineering full-time programs and 8 postgraduate engineering programs.

Engineering departments
Computer Science and Engineering
Civil Engineering
Electrical and Electronics Engineering
Electronics and Communications Engineering
Information Technology
Mechanical Engineering
Metallurgical Engineering

Admission
Students are admitted into the undergraduate programs based on their score in the Engineering Agricultural and Medical Common Entrance Test (EAMCET) conducted by the Government of Andhra Pradesh.

Students are admitted into postgraduate programs based on their Graduate Aptitude Test in Engineering (GATE) scores and rankings or their ranking in the Post Graduate Engineering Common Entrance Test (PGECET) conducted by the Government of Andhra Pradesh.

References

Universities in Andhra Pradesh
Universities and colleges in Vizianagaram district
Vizianagaram